Myoleja is a genus of tephritid or fruit flies in the family Tephritidae.

Species
The genus contains the following species:

 Myoleja angusta
 Myoleja bicuneata
 Myoleja bimaculata
 Myoleja boninensis
 Myoleja chuanensis
 Myoleja contemnens
 Myoleja desperata
 Myoleja discreta
 Myoleja disjuncta
 Myoleja diversa
 Myoleja ismayi
 Myoleja limata
 Myoleja lucida
 Myoleja mailaka
 Myoleja megaloba
 Myoleja mindanaoensis
 Myoleja nigricornis
 Myoleja nigripennis
 Myoleja nitida
 Myoleja reclusa
 Myoleja rhino
 Myoleja sandrangato
 Myoleja setigera
 Myoleja sinensis
 Myoleja tsaratanana
 Myoleja unicuneata

References

 
Trypetinae
Tephritidae genera